The Anglican Diocese of Guyana is one of eight within the Province of the West Indies. Its cathedral is St. George's Cathedral, Georgetown. The diocese came into being on 24 August 1842, when William Austin (1842-1892) was consecrated as the first bishop. Bishops who have served the diocese since then have included: Proctor Swaby (1893-1899), Edward Parry (1900-1921), Oswald Parry (1921-1937), Alan Knight (1937-1979), Randolph George (1980-2009) and Cornell Moss (2009-2015). The current bishop is Charles Davidson (2016-present).

In 1842 (shortly after division), her jurisdiction was described as "Demerara, Essequibo, Berbice". In 1866, there were two archdeaconries: Hugh Hyndman Jones was Archdeacon of Demerara and that of Berbice was vacant. 

The diocese also covers Suriname and Cayenne/French Guiana.

In a 2002 census, about 7% of Guyanese described themselves as Anglican.

See also
Religion in Guyana
:Category:Anglican bishops of Guyana

References

Anglicanism in Guyana
Anglican Church in the Caribbean
 
Religious organizations established in 1842
1842 establishments in British Guiana
Church in the Province of the West Indies